Kristian Heinilä (born 24 February 1976) is a Finnish sailor. He competed in the men's 470 event at the 2000 Summer Olympics.

References

External links
 

1976 births
Living people
Finnish male sailors (sport)
Olympic sailors of Finland
Sailors at the 2000 Summer Olympics – 470
Sportspeople from Helsinki